Gymnázium třída Kapitána Jaroše (historically known as the 1st Czech Gymnasium of Brno; commonly known as Jaroška) is a public gymnasium in Brno, Czech Republic.

History
Founded in 1867 as Slovanské gymnázium, the school is the oldest Czech-language gymnasium in Moravia, alongside the gymnasium in Olomouc. The school was originally located in a building on Na Hradbách street (now Rooseveltova 13), moving to its current premises in a neo-renaissance building at třída Kapitána Jaroše 14 on 18 September 1884.

In 1984 the school was designated as a specialized mathematics academy. Since 1992, 30 of the 66 representatives of the Czech Republic in the International Mathematical Olympiad have been students of the school.

Notable alumni
Notable former staff and students at the school include:

Staff
 František Bartoš (1837–1906), linguist and ethnographer, taught at the school in 1869–1888.
 Vladimír Šťastný (1841–1910), priest and poet, taught theology at the school in 1867–1900.
 František Koláček (1851–1913), physicist, taught at the school in 1873–1891

Students

 Alfons Mucha (1860–1939), artist 
 Vilém Mrštík (1863–1912), writer 
 Petr Bezruč (1867–1958), poet and short story writer 
 Karel Absolon (1877–1960), archaeologist and speleologist 
 Karel Čapek (1890–1938), author and journalist 
 Lev Blatný (1894–1930), poet
 Ondřej Sekora (1899–1967), painter and author 
 Růžena Vacková (1901–1982), art historian
 Ivan Blatný (1919–1990), poet 
 Zdeněk Rotrekl (1920–2013), poet 
 Felix Maria Davídek (1921–1988), Roman Catholic bishop
 Jan Novák (1921–1984), composer
 Josef Koukl (1926–2010), Roman Catholic Bishop of Litoměřice
 Milan Kundera (born 1929), novelist
 Jiří Zlatuška (born 1957), politician
 Petr Fiala (born 1964), politician, prime minister of the Czech Republic
 Petr Zelenka (born 1967), film director
 Pavel Blatný (born 1968), chess grandmaster 
 Jaroslav Suchý (born 1971), figure skater and politician
 Kateřina Mrázová (born 1972), figure skater
 Martin Špinar (born 1972), footballer
 Radka Kovarikova (born 1975), figure skater 
 Danuše Nerudová (born 1979), economist and politician
 Kateřina Tučková (born 1980), writer
 Jakub Hrůša (born 1981), conductor
 Mario Holek (born 1986), footballer

References

External links

Educational institutions established in 1867
1867 establishments in Austria-Hungary
Education in Brno
Gymnasiums in the Czech Republic